Chokdaebong is a mountain in South Korea. It sits on the boundary between the county of Gapyeong in Gyeonggi-do and the city of Chuncheon in Gangwon-do.

See also

List of mountains in Korea

Notes

References

Mountains of South Korea
Mountains of Gangwon Province, South Korea
Mountains of Gyeonggi Province
One-thousanders of South Korea
zh:烛台峰